Mondrian is a general-purpose statistical data-visualization system, for interactive data visualization.

All plots in Mondrian are fully linked, and offer various interactions and queries. Any case selected in a plot in Mondrian is highlighted in all other plots.
Currently implemented plots comprise Mosaic Plot, Scatterplots and SPLOM, Maps, Barcharts, Histograms, Missing Value Plot, Parallel Coordinates/Boxplots and Boxplots y by x.
Mondrian works with data in standard tab-delimited or comma-separated ASCII files and can load data from R workspaces. There is basic support for working directly on data in databases.
Mondrian links to R and offers statistical procedures like interactive density estimation, scatterplot smoothers, multidimensional scaling (MDS) and principal component analysis (PCA).

Overview 
Starting in 1997, Mondrian was first developed with a focus on visualization techniques for categorical data and enhanced selection techniques. Over the years, a complete suite of visualizations for univariate and multivariate data measured on any scale were added. The link to R offers well tested statistical procedures, which integrate seamlessly into the interactive graphics. Today, even geographical data is supported with highly interactive maps.

Mondrian details 
Last stable and beta versions, help and documentations are available on the developer web site, Martin Theus

Supported data sources
Mondrian works on plain text files with tab-separated columns with variable header, as exported from Microsoft Excel as ".txt". If the Rserve link and R are present, Mondrian also reads data directly from R workspace files (.RData files).

Visualizations

 1-d: Barchart, Spineplot, Histogram, Spinogram, Boxplot
 2-d: Scatterplot, Boxplot y by x
 High-D: 
 Multivariate continuous: Scatterplot matrix, Parallel coordinates
 Multivariate categorical: Mosaic plot (see also Treemapping) 
 Geographical: Map
 Special: missing value plot

Interaction techniques
Mondrian supports Query, Select, and Modify.

See also
 Data visualization
 GGobi

References

Further reading 
 Theus, M. (2002). Interactive Data Visualization using Mondrian, in Journal of Statistical Software 7 (11): 1–9.
 Theus, M. and Urbanek, S. (2008). Interactive Graphics for Data Analysis: Principles and Examples (Computer Science and Data Analysis), Chapman & Hall / CRC.

External links
 Mondrian: Graphical Data Analysis Software 
 Homepage for the book “Interactive Graphics for Data Analysis – Principles and Examples” - the book is heavily based on Mondrian
 theusrus - the homepage of Martin Theus

Free plotting software
Free statistical software
Piet Mondrian
Plotting software